Chiara Masini Luccetti (born 26 March 1993) is an Italian freestyle swimmer. She competed in the women's 4 × 200 metre freestyle relay event at the 2016 Summer Olympics.

References

External links
 

1993 births
Living people
Italian female freestyle swimmers
Olympic swimmers of Italy
Swimmers at the 2016 Summer Olympics
Place of birth missing (living people)
Mediterranean Games gold medalists for Italy
Mediterranean Games medalists in swimming
Swimmers at the 2013 Mediterranean Games
World Aquatics Championships medalists in swimming
European Aquatics Championships medalists in swimming